The  New York Giants season was the franchise's 25th season in the National Football League.

NFL Draft

Regular season

Schedule

Standings

Roster

See also
List of New York Giants seasons

References

New York Giants seasons
New York Giants
New York Giants
1940s in Manhattan
Washington Heights, Manhattan